Title 14 of the United States Code is a positive law title of the United States Code concerning the United States Coast Guard.
Subtitle I—Establishment, Powers, Duties, and Administration 
Subtitle II—Personnel 
Subtitle III—Coast Guard Reserve and Auxiliary
Subtitle IV—Coast Guard Authorizations and Reports to Congress

History
From its inception as part of the first issue of the U.S. Code in 1926, Title 14 has contained laws concerning the U.S. Coast Guard and been entitled "Coast Guard". On August 4, 1949, the title was enacted as a positive law title. In the 115th Congress,  was introduced to recodify Title 14. This bill was reported out by committee with a report in May 2017. In the version of Title 14 published by the Office of the Law Revision Counsel, there are two tables at the beginning of the title, the first of which shows the re-designation of sections made by the 2018 recodification and the second of which shows disposition of non-positive law sections to the 1949 positive law title.

References

External links
U.S. Code Title 14, via United States Government Printing Office
U.S. Code Title 14, via Cornell University

Title 14
14
United States Coast Guard